Antidesma alexiteria is a species of plant in the family Phyllanthaceae. It was early classified as a genus within family Euphorbiaceae, but later moved into family Phyllanthaceae. It is endemic to Southern India and Sri Lanka. It is a small understory shrub with maximum height of 8m. Fruits are red in color. In Sri Lanka, the plant is known as "Heen embilla - හීන් ඇඹිල්‍ල", which is used in Ayurvedic purposes.  leaves of A. alexiteria are used as an antidote for many snake bites, and bark of the root for dysentery treatments.

References

 India Biodiversity

alexiteria
Flora of India (region)
Flora of Sri Lanka
Taxa named by Carl Linnaeus
Plants described in 1753